Gregory Lamar Little (born November 4, 1997) is an American football offensive tackle for the Miami Dolphins of the National Football League (NFL). He played college football at Ole Miss.

High school career 
A native of Allen, Texas, Little attended Allen High School, where he was a three-year starter on the offensive line. Blocking for quarterback Kyler Murray, Little helped Allen to back-to-back 16–0 seasons and 6A Division 1 UIL state championships in 2013 and 2014. In Little's senior season, Allen went undefeated again until they were upset by Sam Ehlinger's Austin Westlake team in the state championship semifinals.

Regarded as a five-star recruit, Little was ranked as the No. 2 prospect overall, behind Rashan Gary, in the class of 2016 by ESPN. After his junior season, Little verbally committed to Texas A&M, who had signed Allen quarterback Kyler Murray, only to decommit a few days later. Little eventually chose Ole Miss over scholarship offers from Alabama, Auburn, Texas A&M, Louisiana State, and others.

College career 
In his true freshman year at Ole Miss, Little played in every game with five starts at left tackle, where he replaced Laremy Tunsil.  On December 10, 2018, Little declared for the 2019 NFL Draft.

Professional career

Carolina Panthers
Little was drafted by the Carolina Panthers in the second round with the 37th overall pick in the 2019 NFL Draft. He played in four games, starting three at left tackle, before being placed on injured reserve on December 14, 2019. He was placed on the active/physically unable to perform list at the start of training camp on July 28, 2020, and was moved back to the active roster four days later.

Little was placed on the reserve/COVID-19 list by the team on December 7, 2020, and activated two days later.  In 2020, he started three games at left tackle before being placed on injured reserve on December 17, 2020.

Miami Dolphins
On August 17, 2021, Little was traded to the Miami Dolphins for a 2022 seventh-round pick. He was placed on injured reserve on November 17, 2021.

Entering the 2022 season, Little was listed as Austin Jackson's backup at right tackle. However, with Jackson ruled out for the Dolphins second game of the season (against the Baltimore Ravens), Little was called into the starting lineup and excelled in a record-breaking fourth-quarter comeback win for the Dolphins. After teammates had struggled in the previous few games at left tackle, Little was moved to left tackle for the Dolphins' week 6 game against the Vikings. However, he received plenty of criticism after giving up a 15.7% pressure rate. This performance earned Little a PFF pass blocking grade of just 1.5 out of a scale of 0-100.

References

External links 
 
 Ole Miss Rebels bio
 

1997 births
Living people
American football offensive linemen
Carolina Panthers players
Miami Dolphins players
Ole Miss Rebels football players
People from Allen, Texas
Players of American football from Texas
Sportspeople from the Dallas–Fort Worth metroplex